Since the rebranding of the European Champion Clubs' Cup to UEFA Champions League in 1992 at the start of the 1992–93 season, a total of 47 players have managed to make at least 100 appearances in the competition. The first player to hit the landmark was Raúl, who did so in February 2006, while the most recent member of the "100 club" is Thiago Silva, who played his 100th match in October 2022. The player with the most appearances is Cristiano Ronaldo, who has played 183 matches in the Champions League.

Six players scored in their 100th appearance: Thierry Henry (for Barcelona against Sporting CP) on 26 November 2008, Zlatan Ibrahimović (for Paris Saint-Germain against Olympiacos) on 27 November 2013, Cristiano Ronaldo (for Real Madrid against Borussia Dortmund) on 2 April 2014, Andrea Pirlo (for Juventus against Olympiacos) on 4 November 2014, Toni Kroos (for Real Madrid against Galatasaray) on 22 October 2019, and Robert Lewandowski (for Bayern Munich against Benfica) on 2 November 2021. Of the players who have made 100 or more appearances in the competition proper, only four have never won the Champions League (Gianluigi Buffon, Zlatan Ibrahimović, Cesc Fàbregas and Fernandinho), with Buffon (as well as former Juventus teammate Paolo Montero) having reached three finals without winning.

Players
Players that are still active in Europe are highlighted in boldface.
The table below does not include appearances made in the qualification stage of the competition.

See also
 List of UEFA Champions League top scorers

References

appearances
UEFA Champions League
Career achievements of association football players